Binarowa  is a village in southern Poland.

The village is the site of St. Michael's Archangel Catholic Church, built in the beginning of 16th century. This is one of the six Wooden Churches of Southern Little Poland, on the UNESCO list of World Heritage Sites since 2003.

Gallery

Villages in Gorlice County
Kingdom of Galicia and Lodomeria
Kraków Voivodeship (1919–1939)
World Heritage Sites in Poland